The men's ski cross event in freestyle skiing at the 2014 Winter Olympics in Sochi, Russia took place on February 20, 2014.

Results
The event was started at 11:45.

Seeding

Q – Qualified for 1/8 finals; DNF – Did not finish; DNS – Did not start

Elimination round

1/8 finals
The 32 seeds advanced to the 1/8 finals. From here, they participated in four-person elimination races, with the top two from each race advancing.

Heat 1

Heat 2

Heat 3

Heat 4

Heat 5

Heat 6

Heat 7

Heat 8

Quarterfinals
The top 2 from each heat of the 1/8 round advanced to the 1/4 round. From here, they participated in four-person elimination races, with the top two from each race advancing.

Heat 1

Heat 2

Heat 3

Heat 4

Semifinals
The top 2 from each heat of the 1/4 round advanced to the semifinals. From here, they participated in four-person elimination races, with the top two from each race advancing to the final and the third and fourth entering a classification race.

Heat 1

Heat 2

Finals
Small Final

Big Final

Controversy
Both Canada and Slovenia appealed separately to the Court of Arbitration for Sport that the three French athletes in the Big Final had their pants illegally changed by their coach. They argued it gave the three an aerodynamic advantage over the rest of the field. Both countries first appealed to the International Ski Federation, but were rejected since they appealed hours after the end of the competition (when the deadline was 15 minutes after the close of the race). The appeal to the court was ultimately unsuccessful as well, because the Court agreed with the ski federation that the appeal was filed past the deadline.

References

Men's freestyle skiing at the 2014 Winter Olympics